The Brochet MB.80 was a two-seat light aircraft developed in France in the early 1950s.

Design and development
The MB.80 was a derivative of the Brochet MB.70, using essentially the same airframe, but with a redesigned wider fuselage and revised undercarriage. The Service de l'Aviation Légère et Sportive purchased ten examples for distribution to French aeroclubs. Most examples were operated in France, but one example was later sold privately to the United Kingdom.

Variants
MB.80production version powered by Minié 4DC-32B (10 built)
MB.81version with Hirth HM 500B-2 engine (1 built)
MB.83version with Continental C90 engine (1 converted from MB.80)
MB.84version with Continental A65 engine (1 converted from MB.80 F-BGLI)

Specifications (MB.80)

See also

References

 
 
 

1950s French sport aircraft
Brochet aircraft
High-wing aircraft
Single-engined tractor aircraft
Aircraft first flown in 1951